This page shows the results of the 2006 Centrobasket Championship for Women, which was held in the city of Mexico City, Mexico from July 25 to July 29, 2006.

Group stage

Group A

Group B

Knockout stage

Bracket

5th place bracket

Classification 5-8

Semifinals

Seventh place game

Fifth place game

Third place game

Final

Final standings

References
FIBA Americas 
Results

Centrobasket Women
2006–07 in North American basketball
2006 in women's basketball
2006 in Mexican sports
International women's basketball competitions hosted by Mexico
2006 in Central American sport
2006 in Caribbean sport
2006 in Mexican women's sports